The 1945–46 season was the 7th and final year of wartime football by Rangers.

Results
All results are written with Rangers' score first.

Southern League Division One

Southern League Cup

Victory Cup

Friendlies

See also
 1945–46 in Scottish football
 1945–46 Southern League Cup (Scotland)
 1946 Victory Cup

References

Rangers F.C. seasons
Rangers
Scottish football championship-winning seasons